Erbe may refer to:

People
Bonnie Erbé (born 1954), American journalist and television host
Christine Erbe, German-Australian physicist
Eugen Edmund Eduard Erbe (1847–1908), Baltic German politician, former mayor of Reval (now Tallinn)
Joan Erbe (1926–2014), Baltimore painter and sculptor
Kathryn Erbe (born 1966), American actress
Norman A. Erbe (1919–2000), 35th Governor of Iowa

Places
Erbè, a comune (municipality) in the Province of Verona in Italy
Piazza delle Erbe, Verona, a square in Verona, northern Italy

Other
Das Erbe, a 1935 Nazi propaganda movie